Darcia Narvaez (dar-sha narv-eyes) is a Professor of Psychology Emerita at the University of Notre Dame who has written extensively on issues of character, moral development, and human flourishing.

Biography 
Narvaez was born in Minneapolis, Minnesota. Her father, Richard Narvaez, was a professor of Spanish linguistics at the University of Minnesota. Darcia Narvaez spent part of her childhood in Puerto Rico, Mexico, Colombia, and Spain.  Her first job was with the local public television station (KTCA) in St. Paul, Minnesota, as a 8- and 9-year-old: she was the voice of the puppet, Maria, on the Spanish-language-teaching program Ya Hablamos Español.

Narvaez subsequently worked as a church musician (organist, choir director), classroom and private music teacher (Brent International School in Baguio, Philippines; King of Kings School in Roseville, Minnesota), middle school Spanish teacher (The Blake School in Hopkins, Minnesota), and business owner. She also earned a master of divinity degree from Luther Seminary in St. Paul and is a published poet.

Narvaez earned her PhD in educational psychology from the University of Minnesota in 1993 and joined the College of Education and Human Development there in the Department of Curriculum and Instruction and the Department of Educational Psychology. In 2000, she joined the Department of Psychology at Notre Dame.

Narvaez was married to Professor James Rest until his death in 1999. She is married to Daniel Lapsley, a professor of psychology at Notre Dame.

Career 
Narvaez was the design leader of the Minnesota Community Voices and Character Education project funded with $1 million by the US Department of Education during 1998–2002. She is co-author with James Rest, Steve Thoma and Muriel Bebeau of the book Postconventional Moral Thinking (1999).

Narvaez was one of five psychologists to be invited to speak at the White House's Conference on Character in Community in 2002.

Narvaez's work emphasizes moral development over a lifespan, and the interaction between implicit and explicit processes in moral functioning. She emphasizes the importance of early experience in shaping moral capacities. Her current work is on the evolved developmental niche for young children (natural birth, extensive on-demand breastfeeding, frequent affectionate touch, caregiver responsiveness, self-directed social free play, multiple adult caregivers and extensive positive social support). She studies the effects of early life experience on sociality, morality and thriving.

In her work for the public, she hosts the website EvolvedNest.org which emphasizes the importance of nestedness for all ages in order to maintain wellbeing and compassionate morality. She co-created the film Breaking the Cycle.

A recent emphasis in Narvaez's work involves indigenous wisdom, starting with her 2013 paper "The 99%--Development and socialization within an evolutionary context: Growing up to become  'A good and useful human being.'"  She organized a conference in September 2016 called "Sustainable Wisdom: Integrating Indigenous Knowhow for Global Flourishing" resulting in the volume, Indigenous Sustainable Wisdom (2019). She and Four Arrows have a 2022 book, Restoring the Kinship Worldview.

Narvaez's blog, "Moral Landscapes," at Psychology Today has over 15 million hits (as of early 2022) with the most popular posts being "Dangers of 'Crying it Out'" with over 3.1 million hits, Five Things NOT to do to Babies, and Myths about Circumcision You Likely Believe.

Honors 
Narvaez is a fellow of the American Psychological Association, the American Educational Research Association and the American Association for the Advancement of Science. She is former editor-in-chief of the Journal of Moral Education.

Narvaez's book Neurobiology and the Development of Human Morality: Evolution, Culture and Wisdom won the 2015 William James Book Award from Division I of the American Psychological Association. It also won the 2017 Expanded Reason Award.	

Several of Narvaez's books have won awards from the special interest group Moral Development and Education at the American Educational Research Association: 
Postconventional Moral Thinking (2000 (which also won the book award from AERA Division I); 
Moral Development, Self and Identity (2007); 
Handbook of Moral and Character Education (2009); 
Personality, Character and Identity: Explorations in Moral Psychology (2011);
Neurobiology and the Development of Human Morality: Evolution, Culture and Wisdom (2016).

Selected publications

Books 
Narvaez, D., Four Arrows, Halton, E., Collier, B., Enderle, G. (Eds.) (2019). Indigenous Sustainable Wisdom: First Nation Know-how for Global Flourishing. New York: Peter Lang.
Narvaez, D. (Ed.)  (2018). Basic needs, wellbeing and morality: Fulfilling human potential. New York: Palgrave-MacMillan.
Narvaez, D. (2016). "Embodied Morality: Protectionism, Engagement and Imagination". London, UK: Palgrave Macmillan.
Annas, J., Narvaez, D., & Snow, N. (Eds.) (2016). "Developing the Virtues: Integrating Perspectives". New York: Oxford University Press.
Narvaez, D., Braungart-Rieker, J., Miller-Graff, L., Gettler, L., & Hastings, P. (2016). "Contexts for Young Child Flourishing: Evolution, Family, and Society." New York: Oxford University Press.
Narvaez, D. (2014). "Neurobiology and the development of human morality: Evolution, culture and wisdom". New York: W.W. Norton.
Narvaez, D., Valentino, K., Fuentes, A., McKenna, J., & Gray, P. (2014). "Ancestral Landscapes in Human Evolution: Culture, Childrearing and Social Wellbeing". New York: Oxford University Press.
Nucci, L. P., Narvaez, D., & Krettenauer, T. (Eds.) (2014). Handbook of Moral and Character Education, Second Ed.. New York: Routledge.
Narvaez, D., Panksepp, J., Schore, A., & Gleason, T. (Eds.) (2013). Evolution, Early Experience and Human Development: From Research to Practice and Policy. New York: Oxford University Press.
Narvaez, D., & Lapsley, D.K. (Eds.) (2009). Personality, Identity, and Character: Explorations in Moral Psychology. New York: Cambridge University Press.
Narvaez, D., & Endicott, L. (2009). Nurturing Character in the Classroom, EthEx Series, Book 1: Ethical Sensitivity. Notre Dame, IN: ACE Press.
Narvaez, D. & Bock, T. (2009). Nurturing Character in the Classroom, EthEx Series, Book 2: Ethical Judgment. Notre Dame, IN: ACE Press.
Narvaez, D. & Lies, J. (2009). Nurturing Character in the Classroom, EthEx Series, Book 3: Ethical Motivation. Notre Dame, IN: ACE Press.
Narvaez, D. (2009). Nurturing Character in the Classroom, EthEx Series, Book 4: Ethical Action. Notre Dame, IN: ACE Press.
Nucci, L. P., & Narvaez, D. (Eds.) (2008). Handbook of Moral and Character Education. New York: Routledge.
Power, F. C., Nuzzi, R. J., Narvaez, D., Lapsley, D. K., & Hunt, T. C. (Eds.). (2008). Moral education: A handbook (Vols. 1–2). Westport, CT: Praeger.
Lapsley, D.K., & Narvaez, D. (Eds.) (2004). Moral development, self and identity: Essays in honor of Augusto Blasi. Mahwah, NJ: Erlbaum.
Rest, J. R., Narvaez, D., Bebeau, M., & Thoma, S. (1999). Postconventional moral thinking: A neo-Kohlbergian approach. Mahwah, NJ: Erlbaum.
Rest, J.R. & Narvaez, D. (Eds.) (1994).  Moral development in the professions: Psychology and applied ethics.  Hillsdale, NJ: Lawrence Erlbaum.

Peer-reviewed papers

Narvaez, D., Lapsley, D. K.,Hagele, S., & Lasky, B. (2006). Moral chronicity and social information processing: Tests of a social cognitive approach to the moral personality.  Journal of Research in Personality, 40, 966–985.
 Narvaez, D.(2008). Triune ethics: The neurobiological roots of our multiple moralities.  New Ideas in Psychology, 26, 95–119.
 Narvaez,D. (2010). Moral complexity: The fatal attraction of truthiness and the importance of mature moral functioning. Perspectives on Psychological Science, 5(2), 163–181.
 Narvaez,D. (2010). The embodied dynamism of moral becoming. Perspectives on Psychological Science, 5(2), 185–186. 
 Narvaez, D. (2010). The emotional foundations of high moral intelligence. In B. Latzko & T. Malti (Eds.). Children's Moral Emotions and Moral Cognition: Developmental and Educational Perspectives, New Directions for Child and Adolescent Development, 129, 77–94. San Francisco: Jossey-Bass. 
 Narvaez, D., Gleason, T., & Mitchell, C. (2010). Moral virtue and practical wisdom: Theme comprehension in children, youth and adults. Journal of Genetic Psychology, 171(4),1-26.
 
 Narvaez,D., Wang, L., Gleason, T., Cheng, A., Lefever, J., & Deng, L.  (2013). The Evolved Developmental Niche and sociomoral outcomes in Chinese three-year-olds. European Journal of Developmental Psychology, 10(2), 106–127.
 
Narvaez, D. (2016). Baselines for virtue. In J. Annas, D. Narvaez, & N. Snow  (Eds.), Developing virtue: Integrating perspectives (pp. 14–33). . New York, NY: Oxford University Press.
Four Arrows, & Narvaez, D. (2016). Reclaiming our indigenous worldview: A more authentic baseline for social/ecological justice work in education. In N. McCrary & W. Ross (Eds.), Working for social justice inside and outside the classroom: A community of teachers, researchers, and activists (pp. 93–112). In series, Social justice across contexts in education (S.J. Miller & L.D. Burns, Eds.). New York, NY: Peter Lang.
 
 
Narvaez, D. (2017). Getting back on track to being human. Interdisciplinary Journal of Partnership Studies, 4(1), March 2, 2017  Online publication available at: http://pubs.lib.umn.edu/ijps/vol4/iss1/5 
Narvaez, D. (2017). Are we losing it? Darwin's moral sense and the importance of early experience. In. R. Joyce (Ed.), Routledge Handbook of Evolution and Philosophy (pp. 322–332). London: Routledge.
 
Reilly, T., & Narvaez, D. (2018). Character, virtue and science: Linking psychological and philosophical views. Philosophy, Theology and the Sciences, 5, 51–79.
Kurth, A., & Narvaez, D. (2018). Children's developing morality. In J. Delafield-Butt, A-W. Dunlop & C. Trevarthen (Eds.), The Child's Curriculum: Working with the natural values of young children (pp. 104–125). Oxford: Oxford University Press.
Narvaez, D. (2018). The developmental niche for peace. In P. Verbeek & B. Peters (Eds.), Peace ethology, behavioral processes and systems of peace (pp. 95–112). Oxford, England: Wiley-Blackwell.
Narvaez, D. (2018). Ethogenesis: Evolution, early experience and moral becoming. In J. Graham & K. Gray (Eds.), The Atlas of Moral Psychology (pp. 451–464). New York: Guilford Press.
 
 
 
 
 
 
 
Reilly, T., & Narvaez, D. (2019). Virtue and the scientific researcher: Morality, wisdom and climate. In C. Deane-Drummond, T. Stapleford & D. Narvaez (Eds.), Practicing science: Virtues, values, and the good life. Pressbooks. Available at https://virtueandthepracticeofscience.pressbooks.com/
Narvaez, D. (2019). Reclaiming awe for the right things. In C. Deane-Drummond, T. Stapleford, & D. Narvaez (Eds.), Practicing science: Virtues, values, and the good life (pp. 142–149). Notre Dame, IN: Center for Theology, Science and Human Flourishing. Available at https://virtueandthepracticeofscience.pressbooks.com/
Narvaez, D. (2019). Moral development and moral values: Evolutionary and neurobiological influences. I. In D. P. McAdams, R. L. Shiner, & J. L. Tackett (Eds.), Handbook of personality (pp. 345–363). New York, NY: Guilford.
Narvaez, D. (2019). In search of baselines: Why psychology needs cognitive archaeology. In T. Henley, M. Rossano & E. Kardas (Eds.), Handbook of Cognitive Archaeology: A Psychological Framework. London: Routledge.
Narvaez, D. (2019). Evolution, childhood and the moral self.  In R. Gipps & M. Lacewing (Eds.), The Oxford handbook of philosophy and psychoanalysis (pp. 637–659). London: Oxford University Press. 
 
 
Narvaez, D. (2020). Ecocentrism: Resetting baselines for virtue development. Ethical Theory and Moral Practice. https://rdcu.be/b5xLu

Podcasts 
Hopper, D. (Producer). (2015, October 27). Academic Minute: Companionship Care. [Audio podcast]. Retrieved from: https://www.insidehighered.com
Reagan, L. (Producer). (2016, January 9). Creating Sustainable Humans With Conscious Parenting: An Interview (at Kindred Media) [Audio podcast]. Retrieved from: http://kindredmedia.org/
 Listings

Films 
Breaking the Cycle

References

External links 
 
  
 "Moral Landscapes", Narvaez's blog at Psychology Today
 Evolved Nest website

University of Notre Dame faculty
University of Minnesota College of Education and Human Development alumni
People from Minneapolis
Living people
American people of Puerto Rican descent
Moral psychologists
1952 births